Hortonville is a census-designated place in the town of Delaware, Sullivan County, New York, United States. As of the 2010 census, its population was 218. Its ZIP code is 12745.

Hortonville is the birthplace of explorer Frederick Cook, famous for his claim of being the first man to reach the North Pole on April 21, 1908.

Demographics

Notes

External links

Census-designated places in Sullivan County, New York
Census-designated places in New York (state)
Hamlets in New York (state)
Hamlets in Sullivan County, New York